Regillio "Regi" Nooitmeer (born 16 July 1983) is a Dutch-born Haitian former footballer who played as a defender. He has played for the senior Haiti national team, having previously represented the Netherlands at under-21 level.

Career
He was released by Irish club Galway United of the League of Ireland, due to the club's financial difficulties. Nooitmeer joined Galway United in 2007 on a two-year deal.

In 2008, he was scheduled to move to Drogheda United. He agreed a two-year contract with the club but a heart condition was discovered in his medical with Drogheda. Nooitmeer was forced to retire temporarily from the game whilst undergoing extensive medical testing to prove the original diagnosis was incorrect.  He has since been proven fully fit.

He returned to the Netherlands and signed with SC Neptunus Rotterdam.

In 2010, he joined FC Haka in Finland. He had a great season and was one of the best defenders in the 2010 season. He is widely known for his speed, great tackling and his passion for the game. Regi is a Fans favourite.

Nooitmeer has played centre-back, right-back, defensive midfield and as a right winger. He has also played left-back for Galway United.

International career
In March 2008 he made his international debut for Haiti in a 3-1 loss to Ecuador.

His international career was cut short by the mis-diagnosed heart condition.

Notes

1983 births
Living people
Haitian footballers
Haiti international footballers
Dutch footballers
Dutch people of Haitian descent
Netherlands under-21 international footballers
Eerste Divisie players
Swiss Challenge League players
Regionalliga players
League of Ireland players
Veikkausliiga players
Dutch expatriate footballers
Haitian expatriate footballers
Dutch expatriate sportspeople in Belgium
Haitian expatriate sportspeople in Belgium
Expatriate footballers in Belgium
Galway United F.C. (1937–2011) players
Dutch expatriate sportspeople in Switzerland
Haitian expatriate sportspeople in Switzerland
Expatriate footballers in Switzerland
Footballers from Rotterdam
Expatriate footballers in Finland
Expatriate footballers in Germany
Sparta Rotterdam players
VfR Aalen players
Dutch expatriate sportspeople in Finland
Haitian expatriate sportspeople in Finland
FC Luzern players
Dutch expatriate sportspeople in Germany
Haitian expatriate sportspeople in Germany
FC Dordrecht players
Dutch expatriate sportspeople in Ireland
Haitian expatriate sportspeople in Ireland
Expatriate association footballers in the Republic of Ireland
Dutch expatriate sportspeople in Malta
Haitian expatriates in Malta
Expatriate footballers in Malta
Association football defenders